Marie Louise Lydia Elisabeth "Marlies" Veldhuijzen van Zanten-Hyllner (born 29 September 1953 in Gothenburg, Sweden) is a former Dutch politician of the Christian Democratic Appeal (CDA). She was the State Secretary for Health, Welfare and Sport in the first Rutte cabinet, serving from 14 October 2010 to 5 November 2012.

References 

  Parlement.com biography

1953 births
Living people
Christian Democratic Appeal politicians
Dutch educators
Dutch women educators
Dutch people of Swedish descent
20th-century Dutch physicians
Dutch women in politics
People from Gothenburg
People from Heemstede
State Secretaries for Health of the Netherlands
University of Amsterdam alumni
Academic staff of Vrije Universiteit Amsterdam
20th-century Dutch women